Roger Claeys (6 March 1924 - 20 January 2016) was a Belgian football player. Claeys was usually fielded as midfielder. Apart from playing football, Claeys worked as a butcher.

Claeys made his début for the first team of Cercle Brugge at the age of 14 in a match against VG Oostende. This was only an unofficial début, as the match was played in an emergency competition, organised due to World War II. He scored the winning goal: 2–1. The other goal was scored Marcel Vanhalme, age 15 at that time, and just like Claeys only called up for the first team due to injuries.

Claeys would make his official début against Lierse on 14 September 1941 in a 0–1 loss.
Roger Claeys is the player with the 4th most appearances for Cercle Brugge. He would also be captain of the team for a long time.

Claeys scored his first official goal in 1943 in a 2-7 surprise win over Standard Liège. Claeys was the direct opponent of Jean Capelle, his football teen idol.

After his Cercle Brugge career, Claeys became player-coach of SK Roeselare. He would remain in this position for two seasons, when he quit football.

Further reading
Roland Podevijn, Cercle Brugge 1899-1989, K.S.V. Cercle Brugge, 1989, p. 84-109

References

External links
Cerclemuseum.be 

1924 births
2016 deaths
Footballers from Bruges
Cercle Brugge K.S.V. players
K.S.V. Roeselare players
Player-coaches
Belgian football managers
Belgian Pro League players
K.S.V. Roeselare managers
Association football midfielders
Belgian footballers